The Venus of Dolní Věstonice is a Venus figurine, a ceramic statuette of a nude female figure dated to 29,000–25,000 BCE (Gravettian industry). It was found at the Paleolithic site Dolní Věstonice in the Moravian basin south of Brno, in the base of Děvín Mountain in what is today the Czech Republic. This figurine and a few others from locations nearby are the oldest known ceramic articles in the world.

Description
The statuette follows the general morphology of the other Venus figurines: exceptionally large breasts, belly and hips, perhaps symbols of fertility, relatively small head and little detail on the rest of the body. A feature which no longer remains a part of the sculpture, is the fact that it is thought to have been originally ornamented with four feathers. This is evidenced by the four small holes on the top of the head. Although the type of feather has not been determined, the holes are said to be produced with a tool that is relatively sharp – of which a feather would satisfy.

The palaeolithic settlement of Dolní Věstonice in Moravia, a part of Czechoslovakia at the time organized excavation began, now located in the Czech Republic, has been under systematic archaeological research since 1924, initiated by Karel Absolon. In addition to the Venus figurine, figures of animals – bear, lion, mammoth, horse, fox, rhino and owl – and more than 2,000 balls of burnt clay have been found at Dolní Věstonice.

The figurine was discovered on 13 July 1925 in a layer of ash, broken into two pieces. It was found situated in a central fireplace. Once on display at the Moravian Museum in Brno, it is now protected and only rarely accessible to the public. It was exhibited in the National Museum in Prague from 11 October 2006 until 2 September 2007 as a part of the exhibition Lovci mamutů (The Mammoth Hunters). It was presented in the Moravian Museum in Brno at an expo "Prehistoric Art in Central Europe". It has returned to depository as of June 2009. Scientists periodically examine the statuette. A tomograph scan in 2004 found a fingerprint of a child estimated at between 7 and 15 years of age, fired into the surface; the child who handled the figurine before it was fired is considered by Králík, Novotný and Oliva (2002) to be an unlikely candidate for its maker.

Gallery

See also

Venus figurines
Art of the Upper Paleolithic
List of Stone Age art
Venus of Hohle Fels
Venus of Petřkovice
Venus of Willendorf

References

General Information
 National Geographic Society.  Wonders of the Ancient World; National Geographic Atlas of Archaeology, Norman Hammond, Consultant, Nat'l Geogr. Soc., (Multiple Staff authors), (Nat'l Geogr., R.H.Donnelley & Sons, Willard, OH), 1994, 1999, Reg or Deluxe Ed., 304 pgs.  Deluxe ed. photo (pg 248): "Venus, Dolni Věstonice, 24,000 B.C."  In section titled: The Potter's Art, pp 246–253.

External links

Overview 
Pictures of Venus and other ceramic
Details and timeline
Jihomoravske venuse - South Moravian Venuses - video ( 2010 )''

Archaeological discoveries in the Czech Republic
Archaeological discoveries in Europe
Archaeology of Moravia
Ceramic sculptures
Dolni Vestonice
Gravettian
Nude sculptures
Stone Age Czech Republic
South Moravian Region
Terracotta sculptures
Upper Paleolithic discoveries
Sculptures of women in the Czech Republic
Statues in the Czech Republic